Parliamentary elections were held in Syria on 22 April 2007. The number of seats reserved for the parties in the National Progressive Front was increased to 170 from 167, decreasing the seats for independents to 80 from 83. The election was boycotted by the opposition in exile, who described it as a "farce".

Pre-election events
The number of entrants to the parliamentary election race at the deadline reached 9,770, of whom 2,293 were approved, including 158 women. The entrants competed for 250 seats which are divided among the 14 governorates of Syria as follows:

Results
According to results released on 26 April 2007, the National Progressive Front won 169 seats, while independents won the other 81 seats. Turnout was 56.12% of the 11.96 million eligible voters, and 30 female candidates were elected, exactly as many as in 2003. Opponents of the government and human rights activists claimed fraud and a turnout of at most 10 percent.

References

Syria
Parliamentary election
Parliamentary elections in Syria
Election and referendum articles with incomplete results